Hetek (Hungarian: Weekly) is a weekly pentecostalist news magazine published in Budapest, Hungary. The magazine has a conservative democratic political stance.

History and profile 
Hetek was established by pastor Sándor Németh in 1997. The magazine is published weekly on Fridays and is based in Budapest. The magazine covers articles about politics, public life and religious issues and has links to the Faith Church, a Pentecostal Christian sect headed by the founder. Since 2009 the weekly has been published by the Oláh Printing Industrial Limited.

One of the former editors-in-chief of Hetek is László Bartus, a church leader.

Hetek has emphasized several times critics about Islam.

The circulation of Hetek was 15,000 copies in 2010.

See also
 List of magazines in Hungary

References

External links
 

1997 establishments in Hungary
Hungarian-language magazines
Magazines established in 1997
Magazines published in Budapest
News magazines published in Hungary
Weekly magazines published in Hungary
Conservative magazines
Conservatism in Hungary